Baltazar de Covarrubias y Múñoz, O.S.A. (1560 – 22 July 1622) was a Roman Catholic prelate who served as Bishop of Michoacán (1608–1622), Bishop of Antequera (1605–1608), and Bishop of Nueva Caceres (1603–1605).

Biography
Baltazar de Covarrubias y Múñoz was born in Mexico City in 1560 and ordained a priest in the Order of Saint Augustine.
On 10 September 1601, he was selected by the King of Spain as Bishop of Paraguay but was soon replaced by Martín Ignacio de Loyola who was appointed by the Pope on 19 November 1601. On 13 January 1603, he was appointed during the papacy of Pope Clement VIII as Bishop of Nueva Caceres. In 1603, he was consecrated bishop by Diego de Romano y Govea, Bishop of Tlaxcala.  On 6 June 1605, he was appointed during the papacy of Pope Paul V as Bishop of Antequera. On 4 February 1608, he was appointed during the papacy of Pope Paul V as Bishop of Michoacán. He served as Bishop of Michoacán until his death on 22 July 1622.

References

External links and additional sources
 (for Chronology of Bishops) 
 (for Chronology of Bishops) 
 (for Chronology of Bishops) 
 (for Chronology of Bishops) 
 (for Chronology of Bishops) 
 (for Chronology of Bishops) 

17th-century Roman Catholic bishops in Mexico
Bishops appointed by Pope Clement VIII
Bishops appointed by Pope Paul V
1560 births
1622 deaths
Augustinian bishops
17th-century Roman Catholic bishops in the Philippines
Roman Catholic bishops of Cáceres